Sayed Ahmad Keir (1905–1994) was a  Sudanese politician and diplomat. Keir was appointed to the post of Foreign Minister of Sudan from 1958–1964.

References

External links
 Profile African People Database

1905 births
1994 deaths
Foreign ministers of Sudan